Lele Nairne (born 29 September 1997) is an English international judoka. She has represented England at the Commonwealth Games.

Biography
Nairne won the 2018 European U23 silver. In 2022, she was selected for the 2022 Commonwealth Games in Birmingham as a replacement for the injured Lucy Renshall.  She competed in the women's -57 kg category, reaching the semi finals and just missing out on a medal after losing in the repechage bronze medal match.

References

External links
 

1997 births
Living people
English female judoka
British female judoka
Judoka at the 2022 Commonwealth Games
Commonwealth Games competitors for England